Eleventh Avenue may refer to:

Roads and transportation
Eleventh Avenue (Manhattan), a street in New York City
Westernmost segment of IRT Flushing Line, which runs under 11th Avenue 
 Previous name of Expo/Crenshaw station

Other uses
Eleventh Avenue (album), a studio album of the band Ammonia